Yoo Byung-jae (born May 6, 1988) is a South Korean television personality, actor and screenwriter.

Career
Yoo rose to fame in 2012 when he became a writer on the third season of live sketch comedy show Saturday Night Live Korea. He then joined the cast of the succeeding seasons of SNL Korea, notably playing a star's overworked manager in the sketch Extreme Job. He also appeared in the variety shows Yoo Se-yoon's Art Video and First Day of Work. Yoo's increasing popularity led to Infinite Challenge'''s "Sixth Man" project, where he was one of eight celebrities who competed to become the reality show's new regular cast member (Yoo lost to singer Hwang Kwanghee).

In 2015, Yoo made his first foray into scripted television when he wrote and starred in The Superman Age, a seven-episode fantasy-comedy series about three single, unemployed "losers" whose virginity at age 25 enables them to acquire superpowers. Later that year, he became the first comedian to sign with top agency YG Entertainment, who called Yoo "not just a talented actor with an outstanding comical wit, but also an asset to the company as a writer who brings creative content."

Yoo's comedy special Too Much Information was released on Netflix on March 16, 2018, with a second, titled Discomfort Zone, released on August 17, 2018.

On May 21, 2019 it was announced that he left YG entertainment, it was later announced that he signed an exclusive contract with Sandbox.
 Philanthropy 
On March 6, 2022, Yoo donated 10 million won to the Hope Bridge Disaster Relief Association to help the victims of the massive wildfire that started in Uljin, Gyeongbuk and has spread to Samcheok, Gangwon.

On August 9, 2022, Yoo donated  to help those affected by the 2022 South Korean floods through the Hope Bridge Korea Disaster Relief Association.

On September 7, 2022, donated Yoo  to help those recovering damage from Typhoon Hinnamno through The Hope Bridge Korea Disaster Relief Association.

In November 2022, Yoo donated  to G Foundation, an international development cooperation NGO, to help the underprivileged have a warm winter.

 Filmography 

 Variety show 

 Web shows 

 Television series 

 Web series 

 Stand-up comedy - comedy specials 

Music video

Discography
Yoo released the single My Girlfriend.. on November 18, 2011, under the label Nameless Music/Sixteen Media. On November 18, he was featured on YG Entertainment labelmate Mino's first album XX'' on the track "Hope" (소원이지; sowoniji).

Awards and nominations

Listicles

References

External links
  
 

1988 births
Living people
South Korean male television actors
South Korean television personalities
South Korean television writers
Sogang University alumni
People from Hongseong County
Male television writers